Undecane (also known as hendecane) is a liquid alkane hydrocarbon with the chemical formula CH3(CH2)9CH3.  It is used as a mild sex attractant for various types of moths and cockroaches, and an alert signal for a variety of ants. It has 159 isomers.

Undecane may also be used as an internal standard in gas chromatography when working with other hydrocarbons. Since the boiling point of undecane (196 °C) is well known, it may be used as a comparison for retention times in a gas chromatograph for molecules whose structure has been freshly elucidated. For example, if one is working with a 50 m crosslinked methyl silicone capillary column with an oven temperature increasing slowly, beginning around 60 °C, an 11-carbon molecule like undecane may be used as an internal standard to be compared with the retention times of other 10-, 11-, or 12- carbon molecules, depending on their structures.

See also
 Higher alkanes
 List of isomers of undecane
 Cycloundecane

References

External links
 Undecane at Dr. Duke's Phytochemical and Ethnobotanical Databases

Alkanes